Canagarayam Suriyakumaran (1922-2006) was a Sri Lankan environmentalist and professor. He is a notable economist, a former United Nations civil servant, a specialist in Local Government and Devolution and an Internationalist in Sri Lanka.

Notable work
Prof. Suriyakumaran was instrumental in creating some of the international programs and institutions listed below;

 Represented Sri Lanka in the formation of Asian Development Bank
 Deputy Executive Secretary of the United Nations Economic and Social Commission for Asia and the Pacific
 United Nations Environment Programme's Global Director for Education, Training and Technical Assistance
 Represented Sri Lanka in the formation of Asia-Pacific Trade Agreement, formerly known as Bangkok Trade Agreement
 The Asian Clearing Union
 The Asian Coconut Community
 The United Nations Environment Programme-UNESCO Global Environment Education Programme

Awards and recognition
Prof. Suriyakumaran was knighted at the end of his United Nations career by His Royal Highness the King of Thailand, at the United Nation's Asian headquarters, for outstanding services to Asia
He won the United Nations Sasakawa World Environment Prize - 1995

Publications
 The wealth of poor nations New edition.  Madras: T.R. Publications (1996).
 The methodology of environment and development management Colombo: Centre for Regional Development Studies (1993).
 Environmental planning for development Colombo: Center for Regional Development Studies (1992)
 "Hinduism" for Hindus and non-Hindus: Its religion and metaphysics Colombo: Dept. of Hindu Religious and Cultural Affairs, Sri Lanka (1990)
 The wealth of poor nations London and New York: Croom Helm. (1984)

See also
List of St. Anthony’s College, Kandy alumni

References

1922 births
2006 deaths
Alumni of St. Anthony's College, Kandy
Sri Lankan environmentalists
Sri Lankan Tamil scientists
Sri Lankan economists
Sri Lankan Tamil writers
Sri Lankan Tamil academics
Conservationists